John Shurley (died 1527), was an English noble.

John Shurley may also refer to:

John Shurley (died 1616), MP for Lewes and Lostwithiel
John Shurley (died 1631), MP for Sussex, Bramber, Steyning and East Grinstead

See also
John Shirley (disambiguation)